Anja Fichtel-Mauritz (born 17 August 1968, née Fichtel) is a retired German foil fencer. At the 1988 Summer Olympics in Seoul, she won in the individual and team competitions, and she won the individual competition of the World Championship in 1986 and 1990. She was winner of the World Championships in 1985, 1989, 1993 as a member of the national German team and second in team competition at the 1992 Summer Olympics. From 1986 until 1996 Fichtel held the title of German champion.

Biography
Anja Fichtel attended the Kaufmännische Schule Tauberbischofsheim and fought for the Fencing-Club Tauberbischofsheim.

Fichtel is remembered not just for her many victories, but also for her vigorous fencing style. As Elena Grishina, the Soviet fencer, recalls: 

In 1990, she won the "Russian Cup," an international tournament in foil fencing for women held in Moscow, where the highest award was reserved for the foil fencer who did not lose a single bout. A year later, she again won the same cup.

Seven weeks before the Olympics in Barcelona, Anja gave birth to her son Lauren. She followed her husband Merten Mauritz to Austria and changed her name to Fichtel-Mauritz. She still represented Germany at the team Olympics and took second place behind the Italian team.

The Russians met Fichtel in Moscow in 1993. At the “Russian Cup”, she lost to Diana Bianchedi and took second place. In March 1997, she announced her retirement, and in October of the same year she gave birth to her second baby, and in 2007 her third child was born. Her elder son Lauren has also taken up fencing.

Palmarès 
 1985 Junior World Fencing Championships, foil, individual and team
 1986 World Fencing Championships, foil, individual
 1988 Junior World Fencing Championships, foil, individual
 1988 Olympic Games, foil, individual and team
 1989 World Fencing Championships, foil, individual
 1989 World Fencing Championships, foil, team
 1990 World Fencing Championships, foil, individual
 1992 Olympic Games, foil, team
 1993 World Fencing Championships, foil, team

References

External links

 "For Future of Fencing" International Charity Fund website (original source of this article)
 Palmarès of the Fédération Internationale d'Escrime

1968 births
Living people
People from Tauberbischofsheim
Sportspeople from Stuttgart (region)
German female fencers
Olympic fencers of West Germany
Olympic fencers of Germany
Olympic gold medalists for West Germany
Olympic silver medalists for Germany
Olympic bronze medalists for Germany
Fencers at the 1988 Summer Olympics
Fencers at the 1992 Summer Olympics
Fencers at the 1996 Summer Olympics
Olympic medalists in fencing
Medalists at the 1988 Summer Olympics
Medalists at the 1992 Summer Olympics
Medalists at the 1996 Summer Olympics